A Rise to Power is the third album from Australian heavy metal band Dungeon. It was released in Australia on 1 August 2002 by Metal Warriors and internationally by LMP in 2003, first in Europe on 30 June and then in the U.S. in July. Both versions feature different cover art; the Australian version was designed by drummer Steve Moore. Lord Tim has stated privately that he dislikes the cover of the European version of the album. On 2 September 2007, it was announced that this album would be re-released (with the original Australian artwork) by Modern Invasion Music with a video clip for the song "Stormchaser" included as a bonus addition.

Dale Corney left Dungeon during the early recording phase but his solos in the songs he had co-written, "Insanity's Fall" and "Where Madness Hides", were used on the album.

Track listing
*denotes Australian only release

Songs

"Netherlife" is about Lord Soth from the Dragonlance series
"Traumatised" was Moore's main contribution to the album, reworked from ideas he had originally created when he was a member of Addictive. The song caused some controversy among fans as Grose uses a harsh, shrieking vocal style for the verses against his usual mid-range clean vocals in the chorus.
Video clips for "Stormchaser" and "The Other Side" were made. The clip for "The Other Side" was included on the Japanese promotional album Rising Power and "Stormchaser" was included as a bonus on the 2007 Modern Invasion re-release.
The high note in the first section of "Lost in the Light" put so much strain on Grose's voice that after he recorded it he was unable to sing for the rest of the day.

Credits

 Lord Tim – vocals, guitar, keyboards,
 Steve Moore – drums, vocals
 Stu Marshall – guitar, vocals
 Brendan "Dakk" McDonald – bass, vocals
 Dale Corney – guitar on tracks 4 and 7
 Kylie Groom – flute
 Angel-Lee Smit – voices on track 1
 Allison Amos – character voice on track 10

2002 albums
Dungeon (band) albums